BD-08°2823 b (also known as HIP 49067 b) is an extrasolar planet which orbits the K-type main-sequence star BD-08°2823, located approximately 135 light-years away in the constellation Sextans. This planet is classified as a hot Neptune. This planet was detected by High Accuracy Radial Velocity Planet Searcher (HARPS) on October 19, 2009, together with 29 other planets, including BD-08°2823 c.

References

Exoplanets discovered in 2009
Exoplanets detected by radial velocity
Giant planets
Sextans (constellation)
Hot Neptunes